Halobacillus is a bacterial genus from the family of Bacillaceae. Halobacillus species are gram positive, oxidase positive, catalase negative, rod shaped marine bacteria. S.I. Paul et al. (2021) isolated and characterized two species of Halobacillus (Halobacillus kuroshimensis and Halobacillus karajensis) from marine sponges (phylum: porifera) of the Saint Martin's Island of the Bay of Bengal, Bangladesh. Single colonies are pin headed (very small) in sized and opaque in color.

References

Further reading 
 
 

Bacillaceae
Bacteria genera